
The Lyne ministry was the 29th ministry of the Colony of New South Wales, and was led by the 13th Premier, Sir William Lyne, KCMG.

Lyne was elected to the New South Wales Legislative Assembly in 1880 as member for Hume, serving in the Jennings and Dibbs ministries. He succeeded Sir George Dibbs as leader of the Protectionist Party and Leader of the Opposition in August 1895. The party performed well at the election in July 1898, gaining 10 seats. Lyne resigned as leader in October 1898, nominating Edmund Barton to replace him in recognition that Barton was acknowledged as the leader of the federal movement. In August 1899, Reid was losing support however Labour, who had held the balance of power since 1898, would not support Barton as Premier. Barton resigned as leader and was replaced by Lyne. Labour withdrew its support for Reid and Lyne became Premier on 14 September 1899.

Under the constitution, ministers in the Legislative Assembly were required to resign to recontest their seats in an election when appointed. Such ministerial by-elections were usually uncontested and on this occasion a by-election was only required in The Hume (Sir William Lyne) and Ashfield (Bernhard Wise) and both were re-elected. The other ministers were re-elected unopposed.

Lyne resigned in March 1901 to successfully contest the federal Division of Hume. He was succeeded by his Protectionist Party colleague, John See.

Composition of ministry 
The composition of the ministry was announced by Premier Lyne on 14 September 1899 and covers the period up to 27 March 1901; although some ministers retained portfolio responsibilities until the See ministry was sworn in. Ministers are listed in order of seniority.

Ministers were members of the Legislative Assembly unless otherwise noted.

See also

Notes

References 

 

New South Wales ministries
1899 establishments in Australia
1901 disestablishments in Australia